Ogașu Mare may refer to:

 Ogașu Mare, a tributary of the Nera in Romania
 Ogașu Mare, a tributary of the Miniș in Romania